West Fork is an unincorporated community in Union Township, Crawford County, Indiana.

History
West Fork was named for the fork in the river nearby. The first post office at West Fork opened in 1871.

Geography

References

External links

Unincorporated communities in Crawford County, Indiana
Unincorporated communities in Indiana